Albury High School is a government-funded co-educational comprehensive secondary day school located in Albury, a city in the Riverina region of New South Wales, Australia.

Established in 1920, the school enrolled approximately 1,000 students in 2018, from Year 7 to Year 12, of whom four percent identified as Indigenous Australians and ten percent were from a language background other than English. The school is operated by the NSW Department of Education; the principal is Darryl Ward.

History
Albury High School was established in 1920 and occupied an old hospital building in Thurgoona Street, Albury. Under the guidance of the first headmaster, J. G. Monaghan, the school quickly grew and gained more than 200 pupils. This significantly dropped in the mid 1920s, however after the establishment of a parents and citizens association that was treated as a separate body, the school began to grow once more. The school moved into its current location in Kiewa Street on 28 March 1928, after the building of a permanent site to the tune of $50,000. The enrolment at the class slowly grew, with only a minor hitch when the school was classified as a Third Class High School. Eventually, the school gained its classification as a First Class High School and the numbers continued to grow. The addition of further buildings in the 1970s as well as the decision to include the Principal's residence as a teaching space helped aid the increasing enrolment.

In 2014 a fire destroyed the administration office.

Notable alumni 
 Anne Boyd composer and academic; professor of music at the University of Sydney
 Richard Roxburghactor
 Anthony Miles- Australian Rules Footballer 
 Paul Spargo- Australian Rules Footballer
 Jacob Koschitzke- Australian Rules Footballer
 Gabriella Pound-AFLW player
 Max Lynch- Australian Rules Footballer

See also 

 List of government schools in New South Wales
 List of schools in the Riverina
 Education in Australia

References

External links

 
 NSW Schools website

Educational institutions established in 1920
Public high schools in New South Wales
Schools in Albury, New South Wales
1920 establishments in Australia